Dienstbier is a surname. Notable people with the surname include:

Jiří Dienstbier (1937–2011), Czech politician and journalist
Jiří Dienstbier Jr. (born 1969), Czech politician and lawyer, son of Jiří
Kathrin Dienstbier, German rower